, provisional designation , is a stony asteroid on a highly eccentric orbit, classified as near-Earth object and potentially hazardous asteroid of the Apollo group, approximately  in diameter. It was discovered on 30 September 2002, by astronomers with the Lincoln Near-Earth Asteroid Research at the Lincoln Laboratory's Experimental Test Site near Socorro, New Mexico, in the United States. The K-type asteroid has a rotation period of 4.8 hours. It will make a close encounter with Earth on 30 October 2071.

Orbit and classification 

 is a member of the Earth-crossing group of Apollo asteroids, the largest group of near-Earth objects with approximately 10 thousand known members.

It orbits the Sun at a distance of 0.53–2.88 AU once every 2 years and 3 months (813 days; semi-major axis of 1.7 AU). Its orbit has an eccentricity of 0.69 and an inclination of 9° with respect to the ecliptic. Due to its large aphelion of 2.88 AU, it also crosses the orbit of Mars at 1.66 AU. The body's observation arc begins one month prior to its official discovery observation with its first observation by the NEAT program at Palomar Observatory in August 2002.

Close approaches 

Its closest near-Earth encounter is predicted to occur on 30 October 2071, at a distance of  only (see table).

Physical characteristics 

Photometry by the Sloan Digital Sky Survey has characterized  as an uncommon K-type asteroid, which is typically seen among members of the Eos family in the asteroid belt.

Rotation period 

In October 2002, a rotational lightcurve of this asteroid was obtained from photometric observations by Italian astronomer Gianluca Masi at the Campo Catino Astronomical Observatory . Lightcurve analysis gave a well-defined rotation period of 4.823 hours with a brightness amplitude of 0.52 magnitude.

Diameter and albedo 

According to the survey carried out by the NEOWISE mission of NASA's Wide-field Infrared Survey Explorer, this asteroid measures 1.06 kilometers in diameter and its surface has an albedo of 0.14, while the Collaborative Asteroid Lightcurve Link assumes a standard albedo for stony asteroids of 0.20 and calculates a diameter of 0.897 kilometers based on an absolute magnitude of 17.6.

Numbering and naming 

This minor planet was numbered by the Minor Planet Center on 2 April 2007. As of 2018, it has not been named.

Notes

References

External links 
 List of the Potentially Hazardous Asteroids (PHAs), Minor Planet Center
 PHA Close Approaches To The Earth, Minor Planet Center
 Asteroid Lightcurve Database (LCDB), query form (info )
 Asteroids and comets rotation curves, CdR – Observatoire de Genève, Raoul Behrend
 
 
 

154276
154276
154276
20020930